Parliamentary elections were held in Latvia on 5 and 6 June 1993, the first after independence was restored in 1991. Latvian Way emerged as the largest party in the Saeima, winning 36 of the 100 seats. A total of 23 parties participated in the elections, although only eight received 4% or more of votes and won seats. Voter turnout was 91.2%, the highest in the country's history. Only 66–75% of Latvian residents were citizens and qualified to vote, with the majority of those not able to vote being Russian.

Results

Aftermath
A coalition minority government was formed between Latvian Way and the Latvian Farmers' Union. However, the coalition only commanded the support of 48 out of the 100 MPs, meaning that it was heavily reliant on opposition parties to ensure a parliamentary majority.

References

Parliamentary elections in Latvia
1993 in Latvia
Latvia
June 1993 events in Europe